Otothyropsis marapoama is a species of armored catfish endemic to Brazil.

Taxonomy
Otothyropsis marapoama is classified in the tribe Otothyrini within the subfamily Hypoptopomatinae. Within this tribe, it represents a clade along with the genera Schizolecis, Otothyris and Pseudotothyris, which share unique specializations of the cranium associated with an enlarged swimbladder capsule. The degree of development of the swimbladder capsule in these genera was not found in any other member of the Otothyrini. Otothyropsis has a sister group relationship with the clade Otothyris plus Pseudotothyris.

Distribution
This fish is known from the Tietê River, a tributary of the Paraná River of southeastern Brazil. The region where this species is found is one of the most heavily impacted by anthropogenic activities in Brazil, and the lack of previous records of such a distinctive fish suggests a high degree of endemism as well as vulnerability.

Appearance and anatomy
O. marapoama reaches a maximum of about 4 centimetres (1.6 in) SL. Otothyropsis differs from closely related genera in its pattern of odontode growth, which grows under the snout unlike in other genera. Also, the body and abdomen is almost entirely covered in armor plates, which differs from closely related species which have less armor on the belly. These fish have round lips that form a suckermouth with maxillary barbels.

References
 

Otothyrinae
Catfish of South America
Fish of Brazil
Endemic fauna of Brazil
Fish described in 2005